Daniel Moro  (born 8 August 1973) is a Spanish male water polo player. He was a member of the Spain men's national water polo team, playing as a driver. He was a part of the  team at the 2000 Summer Olympics and 2004 Summer Olympics. On club level he played for CN Atlètic-Barceloneta in Spain.

He is the older brother of water polo player Iván Moro, who competed together with him at the 2000 and 2004 Summer Olympics after winning the gold medal at the 1996 Summer Olympics.

See also
 List of world champions in men's water polo
 List of World Aquatics Championships medalists in water polo

References

External links
 

1973 births
Living people
Spanish male water polo players
Water polo players at the 2000 Summer Olympics
Water polo players at the 2004 Summer Olympics
Olympic water polo players of Spain
Sportspeople from Madrid
Water polo players from the Community of Madrid
21st-century Spanish people